Simbar-Šipak, or perhaps Simbar-Šiḫu, typically inscribed msim-bar-dši-i-ḪU or si-im-bar-ši-ḪU in cuneiform, where the reading of the last symbol is uncertain, “offspring of (the Kassite moon god) Šipak”,  1021–1004 BC, founded the 2nd Dynasty of the Sealand, Babylon’s 5th Dynasty and conducted a program of restoration of a number of temples that had been destroyed earlier by the marauding Arameans and the Sutû. His identification with the Sibir (mSi-bir) named by Ashurnasirpal II in his annals as having earlier captured and laid waste Atlila (probably modern Bakr Awa), a city on Assyria’s eastern flank, remains unresolved.

Biography

Simbar-Šipak lived during turbulent times, where crop failures and almost constant conflicts with semi-nomadic migrants caused the Babylonian government of the preceding 2nd Dynasty of Isin to fall. As a soldier from the southern region of Mesopotamia, he emerged to stabilize the situation. He reigned for 18 years according to the King List A, 17 years according to the Dynastic Chronicle which names him Simbar-Šiḫu, “knight of the Sealand,” son of Eriba-Sin, an individual otherwise unknown, and soldier of the dynasty of Damiq-ilišu, a possible reference to the ultimate king of the first dynasty of Isin, whom the founder of the first Sealand dynasty, Ilum-ma-ilī, had claimed filiation, or alternatively to Damqi-ilishu of the Sealand dynasty. Despite the apparent Kassite character of his name, there is no other evidence of this tribal affiliation. Although there are no traces of his name remaining on the Assyrian Synchronistic King List, the king would have appeared, somewhat implausibly, in the section belonging opposite Erība-Adad II.

Only four contemporary written documents from his reign are known. One comprises two late copies of a royal inscription, known as “Enlil’s throne” or the “Royal inscription of Simbar-Šipak”, another a legal deed drawn up in the king's twelfth year, a third an inscribed dagger in the Archaeological Museum of Tabriz, Iran, apparently found in a river in the eastern Azerbaijan province, and the fourth an arrowhead inscribed "(Property) of Simbar-Šiḫu, son of Eriba-Sin," thus confirming the name of his father given in two late chronicles. The deed details the sale of land in compensation for ransom paid by an intermediary and redemption of the former landowner’s three sons, and the inscription on the bottom edge (pictured) reads:

It would be tempting to identify the first witness with his nemesis and successor, Ea-mukin-zēri but this would be speculative.

Royal Inscription of Simbar-Šipak

This is extant on two copies of an inscription of the king recording the rededication of the throne of the god Enlil in the E-kur-igigal temple at Nippur following the judicious return of the “goods and property of Ellil” by an Assyrian (king) who had recovered them from the Arameans, the original thieves. It states that it is Marduk that sits at the throne where Enlil and Marduk are apparently treated as the same god. The Eclectic Chronicle describes the same event. The inscription goes on to describe the travails inflicted by the Arameans and Sutû, harking back to the reign of Adad-apla-iddina:

In his dedication to Enlil, he describes himself as, “he who puts in order the paths of Anum and Dagan, he who preserves their rites.”

Other sources

The Sun God Tablet of Nabu-apla-iddina relates that “during the troubles and disorders in Akkad”, the Sutû, the “evil foe”, had overthrown the cult idol of Šamaš in Sippar. Simbar-Šipak, had sought to recover it but had been unsuccessful due to lack of divine support – so he suspended a sun disc (“nipḫu”) as a substitute idol, established regular offerings, and installed Ekur-šum-ušabši, the seer and priest of Sippar, at the temple.
 
The Religious Chronicle is thought to record events of his reign, based on the order of preceding kings, and provides some fairly obscure portents such as “a wolf was lurking in the west,” “a badger in the Uraš gate at the door of the šatammu's (temple administrator’s) residence,” “two deer entered Babylon,” and most ominously “on the twenty-sixth of the month Simanu, in the seventh year, day turned to night and there was a fire in the sky,” an eclipse, speculated to have taken place on 9 May 1012 B.C. Things seemed to have taken a turn for the worse from the thirteenth year onward as the chariot of Bel did not come out for three successive years and the eighteenth year was marked by a wave of water coming down from the Ištar gate, entering Babylon, two soldiers were killed and an idol was knocked off its pedestal. This was the year his reign came to a dramatic end when he was assassinated, quite possibly by his successor, Ea-mukin-zēri, “by the sword,” plunging the country once again into chaos. He “was buried in the palace of Sargon.”

Inscriptions

Notes

References

11th-century BC Babylonian kings
11th-century BC rulers
11th-century BC murdered monarchs
Deaths by blade weapons